Champaklal (February 2, 1903 – May 9, 1992) was an Indian man who served as the personal attendant to Sri Aurobindo and Mirra Alfassa for over fifty years.

Life 
Champaklal arrived at Pondicherry in 1921. From 1926 until 1938, he was the only other person apart from the Alfassa to see Sri Aurobindo on a daily basis.

Camppaklal helped devotees seeking the Alfassa's blessings and other tasks . He painted also, encouraged by Alfassa.

References
Champaklal Speaks Pondicherry: Sri Aurobindo Ashram Press, 1975

External links
 Champaklal
 Champaklal as artist

Champaklal
1903 births
1992 deaths